Raknes is a surname. Notable people with the surname include:

Eldbjørg Raknes (born 1970), Norwegian jazz vocalist
Ola Raknes (1887–1975), Norwegian psychologist, philologist and non-fiction writer
Steinar Raknes (born 1975), Norwegian jazz musician and composer, brother of Eldbjørg